Din Daeng is one of the 50 districts (khet) of Bangkok, Thailand. Its neighbours, clockwise from north, are Chatuchak, Huai Khwang, Ratchathewi, and Phaya Thai.

History
The district was created in 1993, when the eastern part of Phaya Thai was split off to form a new district. The district is highly populated partly due to the concentration of apartments built by National Housing Authority. They are along Din Daeng Road and Pracha Songkhro Road.

Its name "Din Daeng" meaning "red soil", derived from the name of Din Daeng Road that cuts through the area because during the period of the government of Field Marshal Plaek Pibulsongkram, the construction of this road made this area full of red soil dust.

Environmental
According to Thailand's Pollution Control Department (PCD) Din Daeng is the noisiest district in the city. It suffers from noise pollution on the order of an average daily noise level of 71.6 to 81.6 A-weighted decibels. A-weighting is commonly used for the measurement of environmental and industrial noise, as well as for assessing potential hearing damage. The safe limit is no more than 70 decibels on average in a 24-hour period. The PCD attributes the noise to vehicular traffic.

Sites in Thon Buri District and Huai Khwang District were named the second and third most noise polluted.

Administration
The district is divided into two sub-districts (khwaeng).

Locations

The BMA City Hall 2 is located in the Din Daeng district of Bangkok on Mitmitree Road near Vibhavadi Rangsit Road. The building is used primarily for offices and business purposes.

In front of BMA City Hall 2 is Vibhavadi Rangsit Forest Park, a small shady public park lies on the length of Vibhavadi Rangsit Road. This park allowed the dog, opening hours from 8:00 AM. to 6:00 PM.

Not far from BMA City Hall 2 is Thai-Japanese Stadium, a multi-purpose arena under BMA, next to the Ministry of Labour.

University of the Thai Chamber of Commerce is located in the district close to Territory Treat Department Reserve Power Practise Task Center of Territorial Defense Command. Surasakmontree School is also located in the neighbourhood.

The National Defence College of Thailad (NDC) is another Thai military institute of higher education located in Din Daeng area.

Radio Thailand Station and National Broadcasting Services of Thailand (NBT) with Stock Exchange of Thailand (SET) are site on Vibhavadi Rangsit Road as well.

Our Lady Of Fatima Church is a Catholic church in the district.

Din Daeng Flat is well-known low-income housing for a long time. Operated by National Housing Authority.

The renowned markets include Rot Fai Night Market, also known as Talat Rotfai and Din Daeng Market with Huai Khwang Market. The Esplanade is only striking shopping mall and entertainment complex in the area.  Fortune Town is another leading shopping mall and hotel on Ratchadapisek Road, the opposite side is CentralPlaza Grand Rama IX in neighbouring Huai Khwang.

Diplomatic mission
 Embassy of China

Transportation

The MRT passes along Din Daeng's eastern border (touching Huai Khwang) with five stations: Phra Ram 9, Thailand Cultural Centre, Huai Khwang, Sutthisan, and Ratchadaphisek.

References

External links
 Official website of the district (Thai only)
 BMA website with the tourism landmarks of Din Daeng

 
Districts of Bangkok